This is a list of tunnels in Brazil.

Pernambuco 
  Plínio Pacheco (Cascavel) 370 m 2007

Rio de Janeiro 
 Rua Alice 220 m 1887
 Alaor Prata 182 m 1892
 Engenheiro Coelho Cintra 250 m 1906
 João Ricardo  0293 m 1921
 Engenheiro Marques Porto 0250 m 1949
 Sá Freire Alvim  0326 m 1960
 Major Rubens Vaz  0220 m 1963
 Santa Bárbara  1357 m 1963
 Rebouças  2800 m
 Acústico  0550 m 1971
 Zuzu Angel 1590 m 1971
 São Conrado 0260 m 1971
 Joá   426 m 1971
 Martim de Sá 0304 m 1977
 Noel Rosa 0720 m
 Eng. Raimundo de Paula Soares 2187 m 1997
 Eng. Enaldo Cravo Peixoto 0153 m 1997
 Geólogo Enzo Totis  0165 m 1997
 Mergulhão Praça XV 0100 m 1997
 Grota Funda TransOeste  2012

Brazil
 
Tunnels
Tunnels